Maytenus cunninghamii is a species of shrub endemic to Australia. The natural range extends from The Kimberley and throughout The Northern Territory and Queensland. The plant grows to 6 metres in height, though it commonly flowers as a much smaller shrub. It is most commonly found in savanna and open forests, though it occasionally extends into monsoon forest.

References

cunninghamii
Flora of Queensland